Darneh is a village in Dasht-e Hor Rural District, in the Central District of Salas-e Babajani County, Kermanshah Province, Iran. At the 2006 census, its population was 27, in 6 families.

Notable people 

 Khana Qubadi

References 

Populated places in Salas-e Babajani County